is a Japanese judoka. He won the silver medal in the middleweight (90 kg) division at the 2010 World Judo Championships. Because of nishiyamas ranking and recent form it has come as even more of a surprise that he was not includeded in the Japan squad for the 2012 olympics. The Japanese judo association instead went with the more experienced masaeshi nishiyamam in the -90 kg category.

References

External links
 

1990 births
Living people
Japanese male judoka
20th-century Japanese people
21st-century Japanese people